The Alssund is the narrow strait between Als island and the mainland of Jutland, in Denmark.

External links

See also
Geography of Denmark

Straits of Denmark
Geography of Sønderborg Municipality
Baltic Sea